Shivani Rawat is a film producer based in New York known for producing independent films like Danny Collins (2015), Trumbo (2015), Captain Fantastic (2016) and Brian Banks (2018). She is the founder and CEO of ShivHans Pictures, a production house that supports feature films that don't fit into the Hollywood model. In May 2020, former head of Miramax and HBO Films, Julie Goldstein, joined ShivHans Pictures as Head of Production.

Rawat is a board member for Annenberg Inclusion Initiative at the USC Annenberg School for Communication and Journalism. In 2014, the American film distribution company Bleecker Street entered into an exclusive distribution deal with ShivHans Pictures, ensuring the US distribution for all its films.

Rawat attended Welham Girls' School in Dehradun, and is a graduate of The New School and New York Film Academy.

Filmography

References

External links

 Bloomberg profile
 British Film Institute profile

Living people
American theatre managers and producers
Indian film producers
American women film producers
Indian women film producers
American women television producers
People from New Jersey
Television producers from New York City
Film producers from New York (state)
The New School alumni
Welham Girls' School alumni
New York Film Academy alumni
Year of birth missing (living people)
21st-century American women